Alireza Khodaei (born 2 March 2, 2000) is an Iranian footballer who plays as a winger for Persepolis in the Pro League.

Club career 
Khodaei started his football career at the age of 13 at Persepolis Academy.

Nirooye Zamini 
Khodaei joined Nirooye Zamini after several years in Persepolis in order to do his mandatory military service. After finishing his service, he returned to Persepolis team.

Persepolis 
After returning to Persepolis in 2021, Khodaei was promoted to the first team and débuted in a Hazfi cup game against Shahin Bandar Ameri, where he came on as a substitute for Ehsan Pahlavan in the 88th minute.

Saipa 
In 2021, Khodaei on loan to Saipa.

International career 
 Iran U-23
In 2022, Khodaei was called up to the Iran under-23 team, and was first capped as a starter in a friendly against Iraq's under-23 team.

Career statistics

Club

National Team

Honours 
Persepolis
 Pro League: 2020–21
 Iranian Super Cup: 2020

References

External links 
 
 Alireza Khodaei at Persianleague.com

Living people
2002 births
Iranian footballers
Association football forwards
Association football midfielders
Association football defenders
Persepolis F.C. players
Saipa F.C. players
Niroye Zamini players
Azadegan League players
Persian Gulf Pro League players
21st-century Iranian people